1628 Strobel, provisional designation , is a carbonaceous asteroid from the outer region of the asteroid belt, approximately 55 kilometers in diameter.

It was discovered on 11 September 1923, by German astronomer Karl Reinmuth at Heidelberg Observatory in southern Germany, and named after ARI-astronomer Willi Strobel.

Classification and orbit 

Strobel orbits the Sun in the outer main-belt at a distance of 2.8–3.2 AU once every 5 years and 3 months (1,909 days). Its orbit has an eccentricity of 0.07 and an inclination of 19° with respect to the ecliptic. Strobels observation arc begins two nights after its official discovery observation at Heidelberg in 1923.

Physical characteristics 

Strobel is a carbonaceous C-type asteroid. It is also classified as a P-type by WISE and as an X-type asteroid by Pan-STARRS.

Rotation period 

American astronomer Richard Binzel obtained the first rotational lightcurve of Strobel in May 1984. It gave a rotation period of 11.80 hours with a brightness amplitude of 0.22 magnitude. In May 2005, photometric observations by French amateur astronomer Laurent Bernasconi gave a shorter period of 9.52 hours and a brightness change of 0.20 magnitude.

Diameter and albedo 

According to the surveys carried out by the Infrared Astronomical Satellite IRAS, the Japanese Akari satellite, and NASA's Wide-field Infrared Survey Explorer with its subsequent NEOWISE mission, Strobel measures between 51.15 and 59.35 kilometers in diameter, and its surface has an albedo between 0.047 and 0.06. The Collaborative Asteroid Lightcurve Link derives an albedo of 0.0504 and a diameter of 57.06 kilometers with an absolute magnitude of 10.08.

Naming 

This minor planet was named in honor of Willi Strobel (1909–1988), staff member at Astronomisches Rechen-Institut (ARI) since 1938, and author of the 1963-edition of Identifizierungsnachweis der Kleinen Planeten (Minor planet identifications, published by ARI). The official  was published by the Minor Planet Center on 20 February 1976.

References

External links 
 Asteroid Lightcurve Database (LCDB), query form (info )
 Dictionary of Minor Planet Names, Google books
 Asteroids and comets rotation curves, CdR – Observatoire de Genève, Raoul Behrend
 Discovery Circumstances: Numbered Minor Planets (1)-(5000) – Minor Planet Center
 
 

001628
Discoveries by Karl Wilhelm Reinmuth
Named minor planets
19230911